Adnan Likić (born 1986), Bosnian footballer
Brano Likić (born 1954), Bosnian composer, producer, and performer
Slavenko Likić (born 1974), Bosnian speed skater

See also
Lukić

South Slavic-language surnames